Bharati Balak is a Bollywood film. It was released in 1930.

References

External links
 

1930 films
1930s Hindi-language films
Indian black-and-white films